Henry Drury may refer to:

 Henry Drury (educator) (1778–1841), English educator, classical scholar, and friend of Lord Byron
 Henry Drury (priest) (1812–1863), Archdeacon of Wilts, England and Chaplain to the Speaker of the House of Commons
 Henry Drury (fl. 1578), owner of Lawshall Hall
 Henry Drury (figure skater) in 2014 British Figure Skating Championships
 Henry Drury, Sheriff of Norfolk and Suffolk in 15th century

See also